Joseph Solomon may refer to:

 Joseph Solomon (murderer) (died 1995), convicted murderer executed by Saint Lucia
 Joseph J. Solomon Jr. (born 1984), American politician in the Rhode Island House of Representatives
 Joseph Michael Solomon (1886–1920), South African architect
 Joe Solomon (born 1930), West Indian cricketer